Asplenium ruprechtii, which goes by the common name Asian Walking Fern, is a rare, hardy, low-lying fern native to East Asia.  It is a close relative of Asplenium rhizophyllum (syn: Camptosorus rhizophyllus) which is found in North America and also goes by the common name of walking fern. The species should not be confused with Asplenium sibiricum which is a synonym of Diplazium sibiricum.

Description
The name walking fern was derived from the way the fern spreads.  The underside of each leaf contain sori, and when the tip of the leaf touches the ground, new planlets sprout, creating a "walking" effect.

The evergreen, undivided, slightly leathery leaves are triangular and taper to a thin point.  Sori, the spore-bearing structures, are distributed in clusters along the veins on the underside of the leaves.  The plant can be found in the shady areas of limestone ledges and in limy forest places.  Asplenium ruprechtii is smaller than its relative, Asplenium rhizophyllum, and usually has cuneate bases to its fronds, whereas A. rhizophyllum usually has cordate frond bases.

Taxonomy
A global phylogeny of Asplenium published in 2020 divided the genus into eleven clades, which were given informal names pending further taxonomic study. A. ruprechtii belongs to the "A. cordatum subclade" of the "Schaffneria clade". The Schaffneria clade has a worldwide distribution, and members vary widely in form and habitat. There is no clear morphological feature that unites the A. cordatum subclade; the sister species of A. ruprechtii is A. rhizophyllum, which shares an undivided leaf blade and a proliferating tip, while the other three species are scaly spleenworts of dry habitats in Africa and the Middle East.

References

Sources
Aspleniaceae Asplenium ruprechtii Kurata in Namegata The International Plant Names Index
Hardy Fern Library
Plant Delights Nursery

ruprechtii
Ferns of Asia